Scaramuccia is a stock comic character.

Scaramuccia may also refer to:

 Scaramuccia Trivulzio (d. 1527), Roman Catholic cardinal
 Luigi Pellegrini Scaramuccia (1616–1680), Italian painter and biographer
 Scaramuccia da Forlì (d. 1450), Italian condottiero (mercenary leader)
 Scaramuccia, early music ensemble